Eshki or Ashki may refer to:
 Eshki, Kermanshah
 Ashki, West Azerbaijan